The 2020 United States House of Representatives elections in Maryland was held on November 3, 2020, to elect the eight U.S. representatives from the state of Maryland, one from each of the state's eight congressional districts. The elections coincided with the 2020 U.S. presidential election, as well as other elections to the House of Representatives, elections to the United States Senate and various state and local elections. On March 17, 2020, Governor Larry Hogan announced that the primary election would be postponed from April 28 to June 2 due to coronavirus concerns. On March 26, the Maryland Board of Elections met to consider whether in-person voting should be used for June's primary, and recommended that voting in June be mail-in only.

Overview

District 1

The 1st district encompasses the entire Eastern Shore of Maryland, including Salisbury, as well as parts of Baltimore, Harford and Carroll counties. The incumbent is Republican Andy Harris, who was reelected with 60.0% of the vote in 2018.

Democratic primary

Candidates

Declared 
Mia Mason, Veteran of the United States Navy, Army and District of Columbia National Guard, 2018 Green candidate for the U.S. Senate from Maryland 
Jennifer Pingley, registered nurse

Withdrawn
Allison Galbraith, Democratic candidate for Maryland's 1st congressional district in 2018
Erik Lane, technology consultant and businessman

Endorsements
{{Endorsements box
| title = Mia Mason
| width = 50em
| list =
U.S. Senators
Chris Van Hollen, U.S. Senator from Maryland (2017–)

Primary results

Republican primary

Candidates

Declared
Jorge Delgado, former congressional staffer, activist
Andy Harris, incumbent U.S. Representative

Primary results

General election

Predictions

Results

District 2

The 2nd district encompasses the suburbs of Baltimore, including Brooklyn Park, Towson, Nottingham, and Dundalk, and also includes a small part of eastern Baltimore. The incumbent is Democrat Dutch Ruppersberger, who was reelected with 66.0% of the vote in 2018.

Democratic primary

Candidates

Declared
Michael Feldman, progressive activist and blogger
Jake Pretot, small business owner, US Army veteran
Dutch Ruppersberger, incumbent U.S. Representative

Primary results

Republican primary

Candidates

Declared
Scott M. Collier, 2014 and 2018 Independent candidate for Maryland's 6th Senate District
Tim Fazenbaker, businessman, executive in the HHS Dept.
Richard Impallaria, state delegate
Genevieve Morris, health consultant
Johnny Ray Salling, state senator
Jim Simpson, economist, former White House budget analyst, businessman and investigative journalist.
Blaine Taylor, perennial candidate

Primary results

Independents

Candidates

Declared
Jeff Northcott

General election

Predictions

Results

District 3

The 3rd district runs along the I-95 corridor from Annapolis into parts of southern and southeastern Baltimore and the northern Baltimore suburbs of Parkville and Pikesville. It also stretches into the Washington, D.C. suburb of Olney. The incumbent is Democrat John Sarbanes, who was reelected with 69.1% of the vote in 2018.

Democratic primary

Candidates

Declared
Joseph C. Ardito, attorney
John M. Rea, perennial candidate
John Sarbanes, incumbent U.S. Representative

Withdrawn
Carole Brown, attorney

Primary results

Republican primary

Candidates

Declared
Charles Anthony, retired Lt. Colonel of the U.S. Army
Thomas E. "Pinkston" Harris, perennial candidate
Reba A. Hawkins, community activist
Joshua M. Morales, political candidate
Rob Seyfferth, grocery store clerk

Withdrawn
Michael Jette, doctoral candidate at Liberty University

Primary results

General election

Predictions

Results

District 4

The 4th district encompasses parts of the Washington, D.C. suburbs in Prince George's County, including Landover, Laurel, and Suitland. It also extends into central Anne Arundel County, including Severna Park. The incumbent is Democrat Anthony Brown, who was reelected with 78.1% of the vote in 2018.

Democratic primary

Candidates

Declared
Anthony Brown, incumbent U.S. Representative
Shelia Bryant, attorney and military veteran
Kim A. Shelton, bus operator

Endorsements

Primary results

Republican primary

Candidates

Declared
Nnabu Eze, Republican candidate for US Senate in 2018, Green candidate for Maryland's 3rd congressional district in 2016
Eric Loeb, anti-gerrymandering activist
George E. McDermott, Republican candidate for Maryland's 4th congressional district in 2018, Democratic candidate for Maryland's 4th congressional district in 2012

Primary results

General election

Predictions

Results

District 5

The 5th district is based in southern Maryland, and encompasses Charles, St. Mary's, Calvert counties and a small portion of southern Anne Arundel County, as well as the Washington, D.C. suburbs of College Park, Bowie, and Upper Marlboro. The incumbent is Democrat Steny Hoyer, the current House Majority Leader, who was reelected with 70.3% of the vote in 2018.

Democratic primary

Candidates

Declared
William A. Devine III, 2018 Republican nominee for the 5th district
Vanessa Marie Hoffman, businesswoman
Steny Hoyer, incumbent U.S. Representative
Briana Urbina, former special education teacher and civil rights attorney
Mckayla Wilkes, activist

Endorsements

Primary results

Republican primary

Candidates

Declared
Bryan DuVal Cubero, veteran
Lee Havis, IMS executive director
Kenneth Lee, firefighter
Chris Palombi, former policeman
Doug Sayers, veteran

Withdrawn
Mark S. Leishear, former political candidate

Primary results

Independents

Candidates

Declared
Rashad D. Lloyd, Universal Basic Income activist

General election

Predictions

Results

District 6

The 6th district is based in western Maryland, and covers all of Garrett, Allegany, and Washington counties, and parts of Frederick County. It also extends south into the Washington, D.C. suburbs in Montgomery County, including Potomac and Germantown. The incumbent is Democrat David Trone, who was elected with 59.0% of the vote in 2018.

Democratic primary

Candidates

Declared
 Maxwell Bero, local high school teacher
David Trone, incumbent U.S. Representative

Endorsements

Primary results

Republican primary

Candidates

Declared
Kevin T. Caldwell, Libertarian candidate for Maryland's 6th congressional district in 2018
Chris P. Meyyur
Neil Parrott, state delegate

Primary results

General election

Predictions

Results

District 7

The 7th district is centered around the city of Baltimore, and includes Downtown Baltimore as well as northern and western Baltimore. It also extends into the western Baltimore suburbs of Woodlawn, Catonsville, Ellicott City, and Columbia, and rural northern Baltimore County. The incumbent was Democrat Elijah Cummings, who was reelected with 76.4% of the vote in 2018. Cummings died in office on October 17, 2019. Former congressman Kweisi Mfume won the special election on April 28, 2020, with 73.5% of the vote.

Democratic primary

Candidates

Declared
 T. Dan Baker, high school math teacher
 Alicia D. Brown
 Jill P. Carter, state senator
 Matko Lee Chullin III
 Maya Rockeymoore Cummings, former chairwoman of the Maryland Democratic Party and widow of U.S. Representative Elijah Cummings
 Michael Davidson
 Darryl Gonzalez, author
 Mark Gosnell, pulmonologist
 Dan Hiegel, Democratic candidate for Maryland's 3rd congressional district in 1994 and 1996
 Michael D. Howard Jr.
 Jay Jalisi, state delegate
 Kweisi Mfume, incumbent representative and former president and CEO of the NAACP
 Adrian Petrus, 2018 Democratic candidate for the Maryland State Senate, District 47, Democratic candidate for Maryland's 7th congressional district in 2016
 Saafir Rabb, community activist
 Gary Schuman
 Charles U. Smith, Democratic candidate for Maryland's 7th congressional district in 2018
 Harry Spikes, former Cummings staffer, 2014 Democratic candidate for the Maryland House of Delegates, District 45
 Charles Stokes, Democratic candidate for Maryland's 7th congressional district in 2018
 Jeff Woodard

Withdrawn
 Talmadge Branch, state delegate — withdrew candidacy on February 5, 2020
 Brian Britcher, firefighter — withdrew candidacy on November 7, 2019
 Leslie Grant, former president of the National Dental Association — withdrew candidacy on February 6, 2020
 F. Michael Higginbotham, professor, University of Baltimore School of Law — withdrew candidacy on February 6, 2020
Terri Hill, state delegate — withdrew candidacy on February 6, 2020

Primary results

Republican primary

Candidates

Declared
 Ray Bly, Republican candidate for Maryland's 7th congressional district in 2016 and 2018, Republican candidate for Maryland's 2nd congressional district in 2012
 Brian L. Brown
 Kimberly Klacik, community activist and Baltimore County Republican Committeewoman
 M. J. Madwolf
 Liz Matory, nominee for Maryland's 2nd congressional district in 2018
 William Newton, election integrity and community activist, Republican candidate for Maryland's 7th congressional district in 2016 and 2018, and Baltimore County Republican Committeeman

Withdrawn
 Christopher M. Anderson — withdrew candidacy on December 9, 2019
 Reba A. Hawkins, community activist — withdrew candidacy on January 24, 2020

Primary results

General election

Predictions

Results

District 8

The 8th district stretches from the northern Washington, D.C. suburbs north toward the Pennsylvania border. It is represented by Democrat Jamie Raskin, who was reelected with 68.2% of the vote in 2018.

Democratic primary

Candidates

Declared
Marcia H. Morgan
Utam Paul
Jamie Raskin, incumbent U.S. Representative
Lih Young, Democratic candidate for Maryland's 8th congressional district in 2014 and 2018, Democratic candidate for United States Senate in 2006, 2010, 2012, and 2016.

Endorsements

Primary results

Republican primary

Candidates

Declared
Gregory Thomas Coll
Bridgette L. Cooper, opera singer and a former music educator, 2018 Republican candidate in the 8th district
Nicholas Gladden, businessman and contractor
Patricia Rogers
Shelly Skolnick
Michael Yadeta, businessman and engineer

Primary results

General election

Predictions

Results

References

External links
 
 
  (State affiliate of the U.S. League of Women Voters)
 

Official campaign websites for 1st district candidates
 Andy Harris (R) for Congress
 Mia Mason (D) for Congress

Official campaign websites for 2nd district candidates
 Dutch Ruppersberger (D) for Congress
 Johnny Ray Salling (R) for Congress

Official campaign websites for 3rd district candidates
 Charles Anthony (R) for Congress
 John Sarbanes (D) for Congress

Official campaign websites for 4th district candidates 
 Anthony Brown (D) for Congress
 George E. McDermott (R) for Congress

Official campaign websites for 5th district candidates
 Steny Hoyer (D) for Congress
 Rashad D. Lloyd (I) for Congress
 Chris Palombi (R) for Congress

Official campaign websites for 6th district candidates
 Neil Parrott (R) for Congress
 David Trone (D) for Congress

Official campaign websites for 7th district candidates
 Kimberly Klacik (R) for Congress 
 Kweisi Mfume (D) for Congress

Official campaign websites for 8th district candidates
 Gregory Thomas Coll (R) for Congress
 Jamie Raskin (D) for Congress

2020
Maryland
United States House of Representatives